The 1991 Colgate Red Raiders football team was an American football team that represented Colgate University during the 1991 NCAA Division I-AA football season. Colgate tied for second in the Patriot League.

In its fourth season under head coach Michael Foley, the team compiled a 4–7 record. Rich Burke, George Delaney and Mike Jasper were the team captains. 

The Red Raiders were outscored 321 to 224. Colgate's 3–2 conference record earned a three-way tie for second place in the six-team Patriot League standings.

The team played  home games at Andy Kerr Stadium in Hamilton, New York.

Schedule

References

Colgate
Colgate Raiders football seasons
Colgate Red Raiders football